Lag BaOmer (LaG Bāʿōmer), also Lag B'Omer or Lag LaOmer, is a Jewish religious holiday celebrated on the 33rd day of the Counting of the Omer, which occurs on the 18th day of the Hebrew month of Iyar.

According to some Rishonim, it is the day on which the plague that killed Rabbi Akiva's 24,000 disciples came to an end, and for this reason the mourning period of Sefirat HaOmer concludes on Lag BaOmer in many communities.

According to modern kabbalistic tradition, this day is the Celebration of Simeon ben Yochai and/or the anniversary of his death. According to a late medieval tradition, Simeon ben Yochai is buried in Meron, and this association has spawned several well-known customs and practices on Lag BaOmer, including the lighting of bonfires and pilgrimages to Meron.

Additionally, in modern-day Israel, the holiday also serves to commemorate the Bar Kokhba Revolt against the Romans.

Etymology

Lag BaOmer is Hebrew for "33rd [day] in the Omer". (The Hebrew letter ל (lamed) or "L" has the numerical value of 30 and ג (gimmel) or "G" has the numerical value of 3. A vowel sound is conventionally added for pronunciation purposes.)

Some Jews call this holiday Lag LaOmer, which means "33rd [day] of the Omer", as opposed to Lag BaOmer, "33rd [day] in the Omer". Lag BaOmer is the traditional method of counting by some Ashkenazi and Hasidic Jews; Lag LaOmer is the count used by Sephardi Jews. Lag LaOmer is also the name used by Yosef Karo, who was a Sepharadi, in his Shulchan Aruch (Orach Chaim 493:2, and cf. 489:1 where BaOmer is inserted by a glossator). (The form Lag B'Omer ["33rd day of an Omer"] is also sometimes used, though it is not grammatically correct in this setting.) The Lubavitcher Rebbe, Rabbi Menachem Mendel Schneerson, writes in his Likkutei Sichos that a deeper reason for the term Lag BaOmer is that the Hebrew words Lag BaOmer (ל״ג בעמר, spelled without the "vav"), have the same  as Moshe (משה, Moses). He writes that Rabbi Shimon bar Yochai, whose yahrzeit is traditionally observed on this day, was mystically a spark of the soul of Moses.

Origins

The origins of Lag BaOmer as a minor festival are unclear. The earliest clear reference to the observance of Lag BaOmer is a brief statement by Isaac ben Dorbolo (12th century, northern France). It is found in his annotations to Mahzor Vitry. He points out that Purim and Lag BaOmer always fall on the same day of the week, but he says nothing about the origin of the holiday. Lag BaOmer is also mentioned in the early 13th century by Avraham ben Nathan in his Sefer HaManhig. The Talmudist Menachem Meiri in his gloss to Yevamot 62b cites the Talmudic passage which states that during the time of Rabbi Akiva, 24,000 of his students died from a divinely-sent plague during the counting of the Omer. The Talmud goes on to say that this was because they did not show proper respect to one another. Meiri named Lag BaOmer as the day when, "according to a tradition of the geonim", the "plague" ended.

Kabbalistic traditions of traveling to any of several locations around Meron at any of several points in the month of Iyyar date to the medieval period, but it is not clear when, by whom, or in what way Lag baOmer was first connected to Simeon ben Yochai.

Nachman Krochmal, a 19th-century Jewish theologian, among others, suggests that the deaths of Rabbi Akiva's students was a veiled reference to the defeat of "Akiva's soldiers" by the Romans, and that Lag BaOmer was the day on which Bar Kokhba enjoyed a brief victory.

During the Middle Ages, Lag BaOmer became a special holiday for rabbinical students and was called "Scholar's Day". It was customary to rejoice on this day through outdoor sports.

Kabbalistic significance
Lag BaOmer has another significance based on the Kabbalistic custom of assigning a Sefirah to each day and week of the Omer count. The first week corresponds to Chesed, the second week to Gevurah, etc., and similarly, the first day of each week corresponds to Chesed, the second day to Gevurah, etc. Thus, the 33rd day, which is the fifth day of the fifth week, corresponds to Hod she-be-Hod (Splendor within [the week of] Splendor). As such, Lag BaOmer represents the level of spiritual manifestation or Hod that would precede the more physical manifestation of the 49th day (Malkhut she-be-Malkhut, Kingship within [the week of] Kingship), which immediately precedes the holiday of Shavuot.

Customs and practices

While the Counting of the Omer is a semi-mourning period, all restrictions of mourning are lifted for Ashkenazim on the 33rd day of the Omer. The Sephardic custom is to cease mourning the following day, celebrations being allowed on the 34th day of the Omer, . As a result, weddings, parties, listening to music, and haircuts are commonly scheduled to coincide with Lag BaOmer among Ashkenazi Jews, while Sephardi Jews hold weddings the next day. It is customary mainly among Hassidim that three-year-old boys be given their first haircuts. While haircuts may be taken anywhere, if possible, the occasion is traditionally held at the tomb of Rabbi Shimon bar Yochai in Meron, Israel, or at the Jerusalem grave of Shimon Hatzaddik for those who cannot travel to Meron.

Families go on picnics and outings. Children go out to the fields with their teachers with bows and rubber-tipped arrows. , the prayer for special Divine mercy on one's behalf, is not said on days with a festive character, including Lag BaOmer; when God is showing one a "smiling face," so to speak, as He does especially on the holidays, there is no need to ask for special mercy.

Bonfires

Religious

The custom may originate in symbolizing the "spiritual light" brought in to the world by Simeon ben Yochai. Some have speculated a connection between the bonfires of Lag BaOmer and the festivals of May Day and Beltane which are celebrated by some European cultures around halfway between the spring equinox and summer solstice on 1 May, and are also celebrated through large bonfires. In Germany it is also not uncommon to see rural men go out in the woods to shoot arrows at demons on May Day, this custom seems strangely similar to the bow and arrow theme on Lag BaOmer.

Throughout the world celebrants gather on the night and during the day of Lag BaOmer to light fires. A large celebration is held at the Tomb of Rabbi Shimon bar Yochai and his son Rabbi Eleazar in Meron, where hundreds of thousands usually celebrate with bonfires, torches, song, dancing and feasting. In 1983, Rabbi Levi Yitzchak Horowitz of Boston reinstated a century-old tradition among his Hasidim to light a bonfire at the grave of Rabbi Akiva in Tiberias on  night. The tradition had been abandoned due to murderous attacks on participants in the isolated location. Later that same night, the Rebbe cut the hair of three-year-old boys for their Upsherin.

For many years, New York based Rabbi Aaron Teitelbaum of Satmar discouraged bonfires, saying it was not the custom to light them outside of the Land of Israel. However, when his father Rabbi Moses Teitelbaum instructed him to organize a large bonfire in the Satmar enclave of Kiryas Joel tens of thousands turned up.

Zionist
For Zionists (see section below), the bonfires are said to represent the signal fires that the Bar Kokhba rebels lit on the mountaintops to relay messages, or are in remembrance of the Bar Kokhba revolt against the Romans, who had forbidden the kindling of fires that signalled the start of Jewish holidays.

Bows and arrows

Religious
Historically, children across Israel used to go out and play with bows and arrows, reflecting the Midrashic statement that the rainbow (the sign of God's promise to never again destroy the earth with a flood; Genesis 9:11–13) was not seen during Bar Yochai's lifetime, as his merit protected the world.

Zionist
In Israel,  is a holiday for children and the various youth movements.

Parades

The Lubavitcher Rebbe, Rabbi Menachem Mendel Schneerson, encouraged  parades to be held in Jewish communities around the world as a demonstration of Jewish unity and pride. Chabad sponsors parades as well as rallies, bonfires and barbecues for thousands of participants around the world each year.

Songs
The popular song "" was composed by Rabbi Shimon Lavi, a 16th-century kabbalist in Tripoli, Libya, in honor of Shimon Bar Yochai. Other songs include "", a poem arranged as an alphabetical acrostic, and "".

Tish meal
A full meal is usually served, and candles are lit. It is traditional to sing "", "", and "". Teachings of Rabbi Shimon Bar Yochai, both from the Talmud and the Zohar, are generally expounded upon by Rebbes at their .

Rabbinic controversy
Some rabbis, namely the Chasam Sofer and the Shoel Umeishiv, have opposed the celebration of or the practice of certain customs observed on Lag BaOmer. These halachic scholars pointed out that the way Lag BaOmer is observed differs from the traditional manner in which anniversaries of deaths are observed, as Lag BaOmer is observed in a festive way, whereas usually a yahrtzeit is marked by observances that "bring out the solemn and serious nature of the day". Other issues raised include the practice of throwing clothes into bonfires, which is perceived as wasteful, the fact that the holiday has not been celebrated by earlier sages, and the prohibition of establishing holidays. Nevertheless, these authorities did not ban the holiday.

Other rabbis responded to the aforesaid opposition by explaining that it has been observed by many great rabbis and that expensive clothes are never burned. They relate what happened on the day of Rabbi Shimon bar Yochai's death as evidence that the day is very holy and should be celebrated.

Zionism

In modern Israel, early Zionists redefined Lag BaOmer from a rabbinic-oriented celebration to a commemoration of the Bar Kokhba revolt against the Roman Empire. According to work published by Yael Zerubavel of Rutgers University, a number of Lag BaOmer traditions were reinterpreted by Zionist ideologues to focus on the victory of the Bar Kokhba rebels rather than their ultimate defeat at Betar three years later. The plague that decimated Rabbi Akiva's 24,000 disciples was explained as a veiled reference to the revolt; the 33rd day when the plague ended was explained as the day of Bar Kokhba's victory. By the late 1940s, Israeli textbooks for schoolchildren painted Bar Kokhba as the hero while Rabbi Shimon bar Yochai and Rabbi Akiva stood on the sidelines, cheering him on. This interpretation lent itself to singing and dancing around bonfires by night to celebrate Bar Kokhba's victory, and playing with bows and arrows by day to remember the actions of Bar Kokhba's rebel forces.

This interpretation of the holiday reinforced the Zionist reading of Jewish history and underscored their efforts to establish an independent Jewish state. As Benjamin Lau writes in Haaretz:
This is how Lag Ba'omer became a part of the Israeli-Zionist psyche during the first years of Zionism and Israel. A clear distinction became evident between Jews and Israelis in the way the day was celebrated: The religious Jews lit torches in Rashbi's [Shimon bar Yochai's] honor and sang songs about him, while young Israelis, sitting around an alternative bonfire, sang about a hero "whom the entire nation loved" and focused on the image of a powerful hero who galloped on a lion in his charges against the Romans.

In modern Israel, Lag BaOmer is "a symbol for the fighting Jewish spirit". The Palmach division of the Haganah was established on Lag BaOmer 1941, and the government order creating the Israel Defense Forces was issued on Lag BaOmer 1948. Beginning in 2004, the Israeli government designated Lag BaOmer as the day for saluting the IDF reserves.

See also
 Hebrew numerals
 Jewish and Israeli holidays 2000–2050
 Sephirot, the 10 attributes/emanations found in Kabbalah.
 Significance of numbers in Judaism
 Hillula of Rabbi Shimon bar Yochai

References

Sources

External links

 Lag BaOmer articles on aish.com
 Chai Rotel in Meron
 Lag BaOmer articles on chabad.org
 Video clip of the Lubavitcher Rebbe participating in a Lag BaOmer parade in 1960
 Jewish Encyclopedia article on Lag BaOmer
 Lag B'omer Parade
 The Great Parade
 Lag BaOmer History and Customs on Shulchanaruchharav.com

Fire in religion
Hebrew names of Jewish holy days
Iyar observances
Jews and Judaism in the Roman Empire
 
Minor Jewish holidays
Traditions involving fire